Aileen Eagleton (5 February 1902 – 1984) was a British painter and wood engraver.

Biography
Eagleton was born in Bexley in Kent and studied art in London under Louis Thomson. She was a member of the Society of Graphic Art and exhibited on a regular basis at both the Royal Academy and at the Paris Salon. She also exhibited with the Society of Women Artists, the Royal Institute of Oil Painters and the Royal Institute of Painters in Water Colours. Works by Eagleton were also displayed at the Walker Art Gallery in Liverpool. For many years Eagleton lived at East Molesey in Surrey.

References

External links
 

1902 births
1984 deaths
20th-century English painters
20th-century English women artists
English women painters
People from Bexley